The 2014–15 CCHL season is the 54th season of the Central Canada Hockey League (CCHL). The twelve teams of the CCHL played 62-game schedules.

In March 2015, the top teams of the league played down for the Bogart Cup, the CCHL championship.  The winners of the Bogart Cup competed in the Eastern Canadian Junior "A" championship, the Fred Page Cup.  If successful against the winners of the Quebec Junior Hockey League and Maritime Junior A Hockey League, the champion would then move on to play in the Canadian Junior Hockey League championship, the Royal Bank Cup.

Changes 
Overtime format: 
The CCHL decided to adapt the American Hockey League's overtime format beginning with the 2014-15 season.  Trials were conducted during the pre-season prior to its launch.
The new overtime format is as follows: 
Following tied games, teams will remain at the 3rd period ends and 7:00 minutes will be placed on the clock after a 30-second break.  Each team will receive 1 point.

The first 3 minutes of over time will be played 4 on 4.  At the first whistle after 3 minutes (i.e. if the clock reads 4:00 or less) the teams will play 3 on 3.  The same penalty regulations apply.  The games are again sudden victory with the first team to score collects an additional point.

In the event the game remains tied after the conclusion of seven minutes of overtime, a 30-second break during which the team coaches will provide a list of 3 shooters will precede a shoot out.  Home teams shall determine if they shoot first or second.  If the score after 3 rounds of shooters remains tied, there will be a continued sudden death single round shoot out until a winner is declared.

No shooter may shoot twice until all eligible shooters have shot once.

Players in the penalty box at the conclusion of overtime shall not be eligible to participate in the shoot out.

Standings 
Note: W = Wins; L = Losses; OTL = Overtime losses; SL = Shootout losses; GF = Goals for; GA = Goals against; PTS = Points; x = clinched playoff berth; y = clinched division title; z = clinched league title.

Teams listed on the official league website.

Standings listed on official league website.

Season Leaders

Scoring leader 
Note: GP = Games played; G = Goals; A = Assists; Pts = Points; PIM = Penalty minutes

More on scoring leaders:

Goalie leader  
Note: GP = Games played; Mins = Minutes played; W = Wins; L = Losses: OTL = Overtime losses; SL = Shootout losses; GA = Goals Allowed; SO = Shutouts; GAA = Goals against average

More on goaltending leaders:

Special teams leaders

Power play leader 
Note: GP = Games played; PPGF = Power play goals for; ADV = Man Advantage Opportunities; PP% = Power play percentage; SHGA = Short Handed Goals Against

Penalty killing leader 
Note: GP = Games played; PPGA = Power play goals against; TSH = Times Short Handed; PK% = Power killing percentage; SHGF = Short Handed Goals For

More on CCHL Special Teams:

Streaks 
Wins
Carleton Place - 10, 10/13/14 -> 11/09/14

Losses
Cumberland - 12, 02/06/15 ->

Home Wins
Carleton Place - 9, 10/05/14 -> 11/14/14

Home losses
Nepean - 7, 11/05/14 -> 12/07/14

Road Wins
Carleton Place - 9, 01/09/15 ->

Road losses
Kanata - 12, 11/02/14 -> 01/08/15

More on CCHL streaks:

2015 Bogart Cup Playoffs

Playoff results are listed on the official league website.

Fred Page Cup Championship
The 2015 edition of the Fred Page Cup was hosted by the Cornwall Colts in Cornwall, Ontario.

Royal Bank Cup Championship
The Portage Terriers in Portage la Prairie, Manitoba greeted the winners of the Fred page Cup, the Dudley Hewitt Cup and the Western Canada Cup.

Players selected in the 2015 NHL Entry Draft
Decided at conclusion of season.

Awards
Most Valuable Player - Stephen Baylis (Carlton Place Canadians)
Top Rookie - Owen Guy (Kemptville 73's)
Top Graduating Player - Marly Quince (Cornwall Colts)
Top Defenceman - Robert Michel (Ottawa Jr. Senators)
Top Prospect - Andrew Peski (Brockville Braves)
Top Goaltender - Guillaume Therien (Carleton Place Canadians)
Top Coach - Jason Clarke (Carleton Place Canadians)
Top General Manager - Martin Dagenais (Ottawa Jr. Senators)

See also 
 2014 Royal Bank Cup
 Fred Page Cup
 Quebec Junior AAA Hockey League
 Maritime Junior Hockey League
 2013 in ice hockey
 2014 in ice hockey

References

External links 
 Official website of the Central Hockey League
 Official website of the Canadian Junior Hockey League

CCHL
2014